23rd Reconnaissance Squadron may refer to:

 The 23rd Bomb Squadron, designated the 23d Reconnaissance Squadron, Long Range (Photographic) from October 1947 to June 1949. 
 The 413th Flight Test Squadron, constituted as the 23d Reconnaissance Squadron (Heavy) in January 1942 but redesignated the 413th Bombardment Squadron before being activated in July 1942. 
 The 23rd Tactical Reconnaissance Squadron (Fighter), designated the 23rd Reconnaissance Squadron (Fighter) from April 1943 to August 1943.

See also
 The 23rd Strategic Reconnaissance Squadron 
 The 23rd Photographic Reconnaissance Squadron